Cossman is a surname. Notable people with the surname include:

Brenda Cossman (born 1960), professor of Law at the University of Toronto
Lynne Cossman, associate professor in sociology at Mississippi State University
E.Joseph Cossman was Born poor in Pittsburgh and he was a self made Entrepreneurs

See also
Cossmann